The 3rd Infantry Division "Ravenna" was a infantry division of the Royal Italian Army during World War II. The Ravenna was classified as a mountain infantry division, which meant that the division's artillery was moved by pack mules instead of the horse-drawn carriages of line infantry divisions. Italy's real mountain warfare divisions were the six alpine divisions manned by Alpini mountain troops. The Ravenna was named for the ancient city of Ravenna and based in the city of Alessandria. Its two infantry regiments were based in Alessandria (37th) and Alba (38th), respectively Alessandria and Tortona from 1939, with the division's artillery regiment also based in Alessandria.

History 
The division's lineage begins with the XI Brigade established on 24 June 1859 with the 19th and 20th infantry regiments of the Army of the United Provinces of Central Italy. On 16 September 1859 the brigade received the name "Ravenna". On 25 March 1860 the Brigade "Ravenna" entered the Royal Sardinian Army three days after the Kingdom of Sardinia had annexed the United Provinces of Central Italy. Already before entering the Royal Sardinian Army the brigade's two infantry regiments had been renumbered on 30 December 1859 as 37th Infantry Regiment and 38th Infantry Regiment.

World War I 
The brigade fought on the Italian front in World War I. On 13 October 1926 the brigade was disbanded and its two regiments were reassigned: the 37th Infantry Regiment "Ravenna" to the III Infantry Brigade and the 38th Infantry Regiment "Ravenna" to the IV Infantry Brigade. The III Infantry Brigade, the former Brigade "Forlì", also included the 43rd Infantry Regiment "Forlì" and the 44th Infantry Regiment "Forlì". The brigade was the infantry component of the 3rd Territorial Division of Alessandria, which also included the 11th Artillery Regiment.

In 1930 the division exchanged the 44th Infantry Regiment "Forlì" for the 38th Infantry Regiment "Ravenna" with the 4th Territorial Division of Cuneo. In 1935 the division changed its name to 3rd Infantry Division "Monferrato". On 1 April 1934 the division exchanged the 38th Infantry Regiment "Ravenna" for 30th Infantry Regiment "Pisa" with the 26th Infantry Division "Assietta". On 25 March 1939 the 38th Infantry Regiment "Ravenna" returned to the division and the 30th Infantry Regiment "Pisa" was transferred back to the Assietta division. On 31 March 1939 the 43rd Infantry Regiment "Forlì" was transferred to the newly activated 36th Infantry Division "Forlì" and on the same date the III Infantry Brigade was dissolved and the two remaining infantry regiments came under direct command of the division, which changed its name to 3rd Infantry Division "Ravenna".

World War II 
During the Italian invasion of France in June 1940 the Ravenna was part of III Army Corps of 1st Army. At the campaigns conclusions on 24 June 1940 it had reached the village of Fontan.

In preparation for the Invasion of Yugoslavia the Ravenna was assigned to XI Army Corps and transferred to the Italian-Yugoslav border near Kobarid and Most na Soči in early April 1941. After the Yugoslav surrender the division performed mop-up operations in Škofja Loka from 14 April 1941 until 17 April 1941, before handing the city over to German forces. Next mop-up operations were undertaken near Mirna village. In early May 1941 the Ravenna was transferred to Pivka and then returned to Alessandria, where it remained until 1942. On 15 March 1942 the division transferred the 11th Artillery Regiment to the 104th Infantry Division "Mantova" and received the 121st Motorized Artillery Regiment instead.

Eastern Front 
The division was one of ten divisions that served on the Eastern Front as part of the Italian Army in Russia. The Ravenna division received orders to move from Piedmont to Eastern Ukraine in June 1942. Before leaving Italy the Ravenna exchanged artillery regiments with the 104th Infantry Division "Mantova", as the Mantova's 121st Motorized Artillery Regiment was equipped with modern 75/18 Mod. 34 howitzers, which were considered to be of better use in the Soviet Union than the World War I vintage 75/27 Mod. 06 field guns of the Ravenna's 11th Artillery Regiment. The Ravenna arrived in Stalino (today Donetsk) in Eastern Ukraine in July 1942 and was assigned to the Italian XXXV Army Corps. The moved from Stalino to Voroshilovgrad (today Luhansk) on 25 July and then proceeded to the Don river, where the division took up defensive positions between Verhny Mamon and Boguchar. In this sector the Ravenna defeated series of Soviet assault between 20 August and 1 September 1942. On 11 September the Soviet forces renewed their attacks focusing on Solonets, south of Voronezh. Afterwards the front calmed until by mid-November 1942, German intelligence spotted the massing of the Soviet 5th Tank Army across the Don. A German officer attached to the 5th Infantry Division "Cosseria" wrote, that the morale of the division and the neighbouring Ravenna was confident considering all the difficulties.

Operation Little Saturn 
On 12 December 1942 Soviet forces began Operation Little Saturn and quickly the intense enemy pressure led to some units of the Ravenna near Verhny Mamon to fall back, thus opening a gap in the Axis' frontline. By 17 December 1942 Soviet forces reached Chertkovo in the rear of Axis forces. The Soviet 1st Guards Army and the 3rd Guards Army attacked from the north, attempting to encircle 130,000 soldiers of the Italian Army in Russia and advancing to Millerovo.

On 17 December the bulk of the Ravenna had retreated to Voroshilovgrad, where the division reorganized itself and then returned to the front defending the bridges over the Donets river at Veselaya Gora-Stanytsia Luhanska 22-30 December. During the retreat elements of the Ravenna had been separated from the division and been surrounded on 23 December 1942 at Chertkovo, where they, together with other German and Italian units, resisted repeated Soviet attacks. From 1-6 January 1943 the Ravenna was subordinated the German Armeegruppe Fretter-Pico and was defending the western bank of the Donets river. On 15 January the Ravenna tried and succeed to break open the encirclement at Chertkovo.

After Soviet forces had pierced the Donets front on 24 January the Ravenna was forced to retreat under pressure from Soviet armored spearheads. On 17 January the division's remnants reached Bilovodsk and were taken out of the frontline. In April 1943 the remnants of the division were transferred back to Italy, where the division was being reformed in Tuscany. After the announcement of the Armistice of Cassibile on 8 September 1943 the division was disbanded by the invading German forces.

Organization 

When the division was deployed to the Soviet Union it consisted of the following units:

  3rd Infantry Division "Ravenna", in Alessandria
 37th Infantry Regiment "Ravenna", in Alessandria
 Command Company
 3x Fusilier battalions
 Support Weapons Company (65/17 infantry support guns)
 Mortar Company (81mm Mod. 35 mortars)
 38th Infantry Regiment "Ravenna", in Tortona (in Alba 1923-1939)
 Command Company
 3x Fusilier battalions
 Support Weapons Company (65/17 infantry support guns)
 Mortar Company (81mm Mod. 35 mortars)
 11th Artillery Regiment "Ravenna", in Alessandria (transferred to the 104th Infantry Division "Mantova" in June 1942)
 Command Unit
 I Group (100/17 howitzers)
 II Group (75/27 field guns)
 III Group (75/27 field guns)
 1x Anti-aircraft battery (20/65 Mod. 35 anti-aircraft guns)
 Ammunition and Supply Unit
 121st Motorized Artillery Regiment (transferred from the 104th Infantry Division "Mantova" in June 1942)
 Command Unit
 I Group (105/28 guns)
 II Group (75/18 Mod. 35 howitzers)
 III Group (75/18 Mod. 35 howitzers)
 51st Anti-aircraft Battery (20/65 Mod. 35 anti-aircraft guns)
 303rd Anti-aircraft Battery (20/65 Mod. 35 anti-aircraft guns)
 Ammunition and Supply Unit
 III Anti-tank Battalion (formed during the deployment to the Eastern Front)
 3rd Anti-tank Company (47/32 anti-tank guns)
 71st Anti-tank Battery (75/39 anti-tank guns; attached during the deployment in the Soviet Union)
 154th Anti-tank Company (47/32 anti-tank guns; transferred from the 154th Infantry Division "Murge" for the deployment in the Soviet Union)
 III Mortar Battalion (81mm Mod. 35 mortars)
 3rd Telegraph and Radio Operators Company
 18th Engineer Company
 18th Medical Section
 16th Field Hospital
 201st Field Hospital
 202nd Field Hospital
 438th Field Hospital
 37th Surgical Unit
 7th Supply Section (expanded to 7th Supply Unit for the deployment to the Soviet Union)
 3rd Truck Section
 128th Transport Section
 247th Transport Section
 49th Bakers Section
 7th Carabinieri Section
 8th Carabinieri Section
 3rd Infantry Division Command Transport Squad
 53rd Field Post Office

Attached during the invasion of France in 1940:
 Alpini Battalion "Ceva", from the 1st Alpini Regiment/ 4th Alpine Division "Cuneense"
 V CC.NN. Battalion

Attached from late 1940 to April 1942:
 5th CC.NN. Legion "Valle Scrivia"
 Command Company
 V CC.NN. Battalion
 XXXIV CC.NN. Battalion
 5th CC.NN. Machine Gun Company

Military honors 
For their conduct during the campaign in the Soviet Union the President of Italy awarded on 31 December 1947 to the two infantry regiments of the 3rd Infantry Division "Ravenna" Italy's highest military honor, the Gold Medal of Military Valour.

  37th Infantry Regiment "Ravenna" on 31 December 1947
  38th Infantry Regiment "Ravenna" on 31 December 1947

Commanding officers 
The division's commanding officers were:

 Generale di Divisione Matteo Roux (1939 - 15 August 1939)
 Generale di Divisione Edoardo Nebbia (16 August 1939 - 3 October 1942)
 Generale di Divisione Francesco Du Pont (4 October 1942 - 8 September 1943)

References 

 

Infantry divisions of Italy in World War II
Military units and formations of Italy in Yugoslavia in World War II
Military units and formations established in 1939
Military units and formations disestablished in 1943